Şıxalıağalı (also, Shykhaliagaly, Shakhali-agalu, and Shikhaly-Agaly) is a village in the Jabrayil Rayon of Azerbaijan. It is uninhabited due to the 2020 Nagorno-Karabakh war.

References 

Populated places in Jabrayil District